The 2013–14 Wake Forest Demon Deacons men's basketball team represented Wake Forest University during the 2013–14 NCAA Division I men's basketball season.  Their head coach was Jeff Bzdelik, who was in his fourth season at Wake Forest. The team played its home games at the Lawrence Joel Veterans Memorial Coliseum in Winston-Salem, North Carolina, and was a member of the Atlantic Coast Conference. They finished the season 17–16, 6–12 in ACC play to finish in three-way tie for 11th place. They advanced to the second round of the ACC tournament where they lost to Pittsburgh.

Previous season
Wake finished the 2012–13 season 13–18, 6–12 in ACC play tied for 9th place and lost in the first round of the ACC tournament.

Recruiting
Wake Forest has a 2-man recruiting class for 2013.

Roster

Schedule

|-
!colspan=9 style="background:#000000; color:#cfb53b;"| Exhibition

|-
!colspan=9 style="background:#000000; color:#cfb53b;"|Regular season

|-
!colspan=9 style="background:#000000; color:#cfb53b;"| ACC tournament

Leaders by game

 Team Season Highs in Bold.

References

Wake Forest Demon Deacons men's basketball seasons
Wake Forest